"High Hopes" is the sixth charting single for the S.O.S. Band. It reached number 25 on the R&B chart in 1982. It marked the first collaboration of writers Jimmy Jam and Terry Lewis with the group. They wrote many more hits for the group during the 1980s.

It was sampled by French beat-maker Onra on his song of the same title, "High Hopes ft. Reggie B" on his 2010 album Long Distance.

Chart positions

See also
List of songs written by Jimmy Jam and Terry Lewis

References

External links
High Hopes at Discogs
High Hopes at Allmusic

1982 singles
The S.O.S. Band songs
Songs written by Jimmy Jam and Terry Lewis
1982 songs
Tabu Records singles